Astros in sports may refer to:

The Houston Astros, a Major League Baseball team
Astros (gridiron team), an American football team in Australia
Astros Field, now renamed Minute Maid Park

Astros may also refer to:
Astros (album), by Colombian singer-songwriter Anasol
Astros, Greece, a municipality in Arcadia, Greece
The Astros II MLRS rocket launcher
a candy brand Astros (chocolate)
ASTROS, Automated STRuctural Optimization System

See also
Astro (disambiguation)